Messrs. Drummond is a formerly independent private bank that is now part of NatWest Group. The Royal Bank of Scotland incorporating Messrs. Drummond, Bankers is based at 49 Charing Cross in central London. Drummonds is authorised as a brand of The Royal Bank of Scotland by the Prudential Regulation Authority.

History
Goldsmith Andrew Drummond (1688–1769) founded the bank in 1717. The bank remained within the Drummonds family until 1924, when it became known as the Drummonds Branch of the Royal Bank of Scotland. The bank was the Royal Bank's first acquisition south of the Scottish border. 

In 1992, RBS Holt's branch, Whitehall was absorbed by London Drummonds branch; it continues to operate as Holt's Military Banking, based in Farnborough, offering personal banking tailored to the needs of navy, army and air force officers.

The bank offers a variety of services to its private clients, including wealth and asset management. It has been based at its headquarters since 1760. Prior to 1758, the site was occupied by the townhouse, Naunton House. In 1758 the Westminster Bridge Commissioners purchased Naunton House and its neighbouring houses, for the purpose of widening the street. The surplus property was sold to Drummond's for £1,100. The building was reconstructed from 1877 to 1881; Admiralty Arch was built and The Mall laid out nearby shortly after. The building is listed Grade II on Historic England's register of listed buildings.

Drummonds' focus on wealth management led the bank to creating a specialised department for UK National Lottery winners separate from its more traditional practices.

Clients
As is tradition with most London private banks, account holders' identities are kept a bank secret. Some historical clients have though been revealed, including a variety of distinguished figures: HM King George III and other members of the royal family, Alexander Pope, Benjamin Disraeli, Beau Brummell, Isambard Kingdom Brunel, Robert and James Adam, Capability Brown, Josiah Wedgwood, and Thomas Gainsborough. The bank also holds accounts for organisations and institutions such as the Conservative Party and Royal Academy.

Royal account holders
Both Coutts & Co. and Drummonds have received royal patronage. King George III moved his account from Coutts to Drummonds during his reign as he was displeased with Coutts for bank-rolling the Prince of Wales from his personal account. Messrs Drummond & Co. honoured the wishes of the King, but unsurprisingly when the Prince of Wales became King George IV in 1820, he moved the royal account back to Coutts. More recent known members of the royal family to bank at Drummonds include the late Queen Elizabeth The Queen Mother.

See also

Adam and Company
Child & Co
Coutts
Holt's Military Banking

References

Further reading

1717 establishments in England
Banks established in 1717
Grade II listed banks
Grade II listed buildings in the City of Westminster
Italianate architecture in Scotland
Office buildings completed in 1885
Private banks
Royal Bank of Scotland
British companies established in 1717
Banking in Great Britain